Long Creek is an unincorporated community and census-designated place (CDP) in Pender County, North Carolina, United States. It was first listed as a CDP in the 2020 census with a population of 277.

The community is in southwestern Pender County, along North Carolina Highway 210. It is named for Long Creek, a southward-flowing stream that runs along the western edge of the community and leads southeast to the Northeast Cape Fear River.

Demographics

2020 census

Note: the US Census treats Hispanic/Latino as an ethnic category. This table excludes Latinos from the racial categories and assigns them to a separate category. Hispanics/Latinos can be of any race.

References 

Census-designated places in Pender County, North Carolina
Census-designated places in North Carolina